Trypanosoma irwini is a blood parasite of koalas. First discovered in 2009 by Linda M. McInnes and her peers, it was named in honor of Steve Irwin, "The Crocodile Hunter". The study done by McInnes et al. was the first to describe a Trypanosoma species from koalas.

Taxonomic summary
 Vertebrate host: Koalas (Phascolarctos cinereus)
 Invertebrate host: None currently known
 Type location: New South Wales, Australia
 Other locations: A range of locations in Queensland, Australia
 Site of infection: blood

Host

The koala (Phascolarctos cinereus) is distributed in patches throughout the eastern regions of Australia. The International Union for Conservation of Nature and Natural Resources (IUCN) listed the koala as potentially vulnerable in 1992, and the New South Wales Threatened Species Conservation Act of 1995 and the Queensland Nature Conservation Regulation Act of 2006 categorized the koala as vulnerable to extinction in New South Wales and Queensland.

Over the years, the koala population has experienced a loss of genetic diversity through population bottlenecks and founder effects. To combat the loss in diversity, IUCN has released captive koalas into the wild to reintroduce the species. Nonetheless, a significant reduction in the koala population over the past 200 years is apparent.

Description
The vector for this parasite is currently unknown, although trypanosome vectors are generally blood-eating arthropods such as mosquitoes, ticks, fleas, mites, and flies. It is likely that the life cycle of T. irwini is similar to that of other Trypanosomes: alternating between sexual (vector host) and asexual (vertebrate host). T. irwini was found in the blood of koalas with the trypomastigote morphology.

 Total length: body length measured along mid-line including free flagellum (total length)
 Breadth: maximum breadth measured at nucleus level (including undulating membrane)
 PK: distance between the posterior end and the kinetoplast
 KN: distance between the kinetoplast and posterior edge of the nucleus
 NA: distance between the anterior edge of the nucleus and the anterior end of the body
 FF: length of the free flagellum

Phylogeny
Phylogeny analysis of the 18S rDNA and gGADPH loci that T. Irwini is genetically closest to Trypanosoma bennetti, which is an avian trypanosome. Further comparison of the 18S rDNA sequences against the data available in the Genbank shows that T. irwini can be grouped with Trypanosoma minasense, which is a trypanosome of neotropical primates collected from Australian marsupials.

Pathogenicity
The pathogenicity of Trypanosoma irwini is unclear.

Diagnosis
Blood smears show Trypanosoma irwini parasites with physical characteristics resembling the trypomastigote stage of other well-known trypanosomatids. These organisms are long and thin, consisting of a pointy posterior and a long free flagellum. They have an undulating membrane, a kinetoplast, and a nucleus.

In vitro culture
This parasite has not yet been successfully cultured in vitro.

Symptoms
According to the study done by McInnes et al., the sentinel koala exhibited signs of depression, weakness, pale mucous membrane, and keratoconjunctivitis. Other clinical findings include anemia, and cytological exam of bone marrow shows erythroid hyperplasia. The koala examined for the study was euthanized due to liver and kidney failure. A post-mortem examination revealed osteochondromas in the ribs, lymphoid atrophy, extensive periacinar necrosis of the liver, interstitial nephritis, extramedullary hematopoiesis of the spleen, and other problems. While not all of these clinical and pathological findings are consistent with symptoms and signs of trypanosomiasis, those that suggest extravascular hemolysis and generalized immune reaction are.

Gallery

See also
 List of organisms named after famous people (born 1950–present)

References

Trypanosomatida
Parasites of marsupials
Steve Irwin